Dubrovskoye is a rural locality (a settlement) in Semyonkovskoye Rural Settlement, Vologodsky District, Vologda Oblast, Russia. The population was 1,054 as of 2002. There are 11 streets.

Geography 
Dubrovskoye is located 16 km north of Vologda (the district's administrative centre) by road. Obukhovo is the nearest rural locality.

References 

Rural localities in Vologodsky District